The 1936 Cupa României Final was the third final of Romania's most prestigious football cup competition. It was disputed between Ripensia Timişoara and Unirea Tricolor București, and was won by Ripensia Timişoara after a game with 6 goals. It was the second cup trophy won by the Timișoara team.

Match details

See also 
List of Cupa României finals

References

External links
Romaniansoccer.ro

1936
Cupa
Romania